Archives of Toxicology is a peer-reviewed medical journal covering all aspects of toxicology. It was established in 1930 as Sammlung von Vergiftungsfällen, renamed in 1954 into Archiv für Toxikologie and obtained its current title in 1974. The journal is published by Springer Science+Business Media and the editor-in-chief is Jan G. Hengstler (Leibniz Research Centre for Working Environment and Human Factors).

Abstracting and indexing 
The journal is abstracted and indexed in:

According to the Journal Citation Reports, the journal has a 2020 impact factor of 5.153.

References

External links
Website link

Toxicology journals
Monthly journals
Publications established in 1930
Springer Science+Business Media academic journals
English-language journals